Xuzhou No.32 Middle School Homicide (徐州第三十二中学杀人事件), also known as Xuzhou No.32 Middle School Stabbing, was a homicide that took place inside the No.32 Middle School (formerly known as No.2 Railway Middle School) in Xuzhou on February 13, 2012. One student was killed in this incident, and the school was accused of failing to save the victim.The victim of this incident was Xiangyu Wang,  a 9th grader attending No.32 High. He died from this incident at the age of 15.

See also 
List of attacks related to secondary schools
Social issues in China

References 

Xuzhou
School killings in China
2012 in education
February 2012 crimes
Secondary schools in China
History of Jiangsu
China